Niefern-Öschelbronn is a municipality in the Enz district, in Baden-Württemberg, Germany. It is situated on the river Enz, 6 km east of Pforzheim.

History
Öschelbronn had been a possession of the Duchy of Württemberg since 1504, while Niefern was a possession of the Margraviate of Baden from 1529. Öschelbronn was ceded to Baden in an 1810 exchange of territories between the now Kingdom of Württemberg and Grand Duchy of Baden, and it and Niefern were assigned to the district of Pforzheim. On 1 August 1971, Öschelbronn was incorporated into Niefern, which changed its name to Niefern-Öschelbronn on 18 November 1971.

Geography
The primary watercourse is the Enz, whose wide valley makes up the northern area of the municipality. The banks of the Enz are the site of the lowest elevation above sea water in the municipality at  Normalnull (NN). The highest elevation,  NN, is the Steinbuckel, in the south of the municipality.

Coat of arms
Niefern-Öschelbronn's municipal coat of arms is a combination of Niefern and Öschelbronn's coats of arms and their tinctures. It depicts a golden fountain with silver waters and three gold six-pointed stars upon a field of blue. The image of a fountain had been in Öschelbronn's seals as early as 1755. The three stars, of Niefern, were taken from the coat of arms of Martin Achtsynit, Chancellor of Charles II, Margrave of Baden-Durlach, who had a castle in the town. The municipal coat of arms was approved by the Federal Ministry of the Interior on 31 July 1972.

See also
 Official website (in German)
 Krankenhaus (in German)
 Wirtschaftlich stärkstes Unternehmen (in German)
 Zentrum für Lebensgestaltung im Alter (in German)

References

Niefernoschelbronn
Baden